Kroussa or Kroussia (Bulgarian and Macedonian Slavic:  Krusha, meaning "pear") is a former municipality in Kilkis regional unit, Greece. Since the 2011 local government reform it is part of the municipality Kilkis, of which it is a municipal unit. It is located in the northeastern corner of the regional unit, bordering western Serres and northern Thessaloniki. The municipal unit has an area of 588.877 km2. Its population is 4,638 (2011 census). The seat of the municipality was in Terpyllos (pop. 483). Melissourgio is one of the most picturesque villages in the municipal unit. Agios Antonios is one of the villages nearby. The largest villages in the municipal unit are Efkarpía (pop. 514), Térpyllos, Eptálofos (360), Váthi (309) and Fyska (152). The municipal unit is divided into 19 communities. In Palatiano, there is the most important archaeological site of Northern Greece. It was the ancient city of Ioron, flourished from 10th century BC to 3rd century AD, continuously.

In the Macedonian Struggle, people of Kroussa villages fought in order to free their lands from Turkish and Bulgarians. Some of the Macedonian Fighters are:
Ioannis Villioglou "Kapetan Ramnalis", Issoma, (1885–1923)
father Dimitrios Papadimitriou, Issoma
Nikolaos Kapoulas, Koronouda

External links
Official website

References

Populated places in Kilkis (regional unit)

bg:Круша (дем)